Paolo César Vivar Araya (born 11 March 1977) is a Chilean former professional footballer who played as a left winger for clubs in Chile and Indonesia.

Club career
A left winger from the Deportes Ovalle youth system, Vivar also could play as a left midfielder or left wing back. He began his career making appearances for the club in the 1995 and the 1996 seasons of the Chilean second division. 

In Chile, he also played for Cobreloa, where he had his better seasons, Unión San Felipe and Rangers de Talca. 

Abroad, he played in Indonesia for Persija Jakarta, Persikota Tangerang, Persema Malang and Persela Lamongan.

His last club was Cobreloa in 2009.

International career
Vivar represented Chile at under-20 level in the 1997 South American Championship.

At senior level, he made an appearance for the Chile national team in a 1–1 draw versus Iran on 31 January 1998. Previously, he took part in an unofficial match against a team made up by players from the Hong Kong league, with a 3–1 loss. In addition, he played in the 2–1 win for the B-team against England B on 10 February 1998.

Personal life
After his retirement, he switched to the mining industry and has worked as a mechanic and crane operator.

References

External links
 
 
 Paolo Vivar at PartidosdeLaRoja.com 

1977 births
Living people
People from Ovalle
Chilean footballers
Chilean expatriate footballers
Chile under-20 international footballers
Chile international footballers
Deportes Ovalle footballers
Cobreloa footballers
Unión San Felipe footballers
Rangers de Talca footballers
Persija Jakarta players
Persikota Tangerang players
Persema Malang players
Persela Lamongan players
Primera B de Chile players
Chilean Primera División players
Indonesian Premier Division players
Chilean expatriate sportspeople in Indonesia
Expatriate footballers in Indonesia
Association football forwards